Campiglossa putrida is a species of tephritid or fruit flies in the genus Campiglossa of the family Tephritidae.

Distribution
The species is found in Indonesia, New Guinea.

References

Tephritinae
Insects described in 1941
Diptera of Asia
Diptera of Australasia